Buford may refer to:

Places

United States
Buford, Arkansas
Buford, Colorado, an unincorporated community
Buford, Georgia
Buford Highway corridor, in Fulton, DeKalb, and Gwinnett Counties in Georgia
Buford, North Dakota
Buford, Ohio
Buford, South Carolina
Buford, Texas (disambiguation) (two places)
Buford, Virginia
Buford, Wyoming
Fort Buford

Canada
Buford, Alberta

People
Buford (surname)
Buford Abner, American songwriter
Buford Allison, professional football player
Buford Ellington, 42nd governor of Tennessee
Buford F. Gordon, African American civil rights activist, clergyman and social scientist
Buford A. Johnson, member of the Tuskegee Airmen
Buford Jordan, professional football player
Buford Long, professional football player
Buford McGee, professional football player
Buford Meredith, American baseball player for the Negro leagues
Buford Nunley, American baseball player for the Negro leagues
P. Buford Price, American professor
Buford Pusser, Tennessee sheriff whose life was made into a series of movies
Buford Ray, professional football player
Buford John Schramm, businessman and light helicopter developer

Ship
USAT Buford, a ship used to deport aliens from the U.S. in 1919

Other
Buford v. United States, a 2001 Supreme Court case
Buford T. Justice, fictional character played by Jackie Gleason in the Smokey and the Bandit films
Buford, a pink dog from the cartoon show Buford and the Galloping Ghost
Buford Van Stomm, one of the supporting characters on Disney's Phineas and Ferb
Buford, the name of Leo Valdez's walking table in Rick Riordan's Heroes of Olympus series
Buford Tannen, the antagonist of Back to the Future Part III

See also
Bruford (disambiguation)
Burford (disambiguation)
Bluford (disambiguation)
Ford (disambiguation)